Sarab-e Sheykh Hasan (also Romanized as Sarāb-e Sheykh Ḩasan; also known as Sarāb) is a village in Panjeh Ali-ye Jonubi Rural District, in the Central District of Qorveh County, Kurdistan Province, Iran. At the 2006 census, its population was 257, in 57 families. The village is populated by Kurds.

References 

Towns and villages in Qorveh County
Kurdish settlements in Kurdistan Province